Three Bears Lake is located in Glacier National Park, in the U. S. state of Montana.

See also
List of lakes in Glacier County, Montana

References

External links
Historic American Engineering Record (HAER) documentation, filed under North of Marias Pass, East Glacier Park vicinity, Glacier County, MT:

Lakes of Glacier National Park (U.S.)
Lakes of Glacier County, Montana
Historic American Engineering Record in Montana